The 2019–20 season is Brescia Leonessa's 11th in existence and the club's 5th consecutive season in the top flight of Italian basketball.

Overview 
Brescia writes the club's history in Europe by achieving the Top16 of the EuroCup Basketball for the first time since its foundation. They were eliminated in the very last match against Reyer Venezia.

The 2019-20 season was hit by the coronavirus pandemic that compelled the federation to suspend and later cancel the competition without assigning the title to anyone. Brescia ended the championship in 3rd position.

Kit 
Supplier: Errea / Sponsor: Germani

Players

Current roster

Depth chart

Squad changes

In

|}

Out

|}

Confirmed 

|}

Coach

Unsuccessful deals 
The following deal never activated and the player's contract was withdrawn before the beginning of the season.

Competitions

Serie A

EuroCup

Regular season

Top 16

Italian Cup 
Brescia qualified to the 2020 Italian Basketball Cup having ended the first half of the season in 3rd place. They lost the first match in the quarter finals against Pompea Fortitudo Bologna.

References 

2019–20 in Italian basketball by club
2019–20 EuroCup Basketball by club